Daryl Millard (born 20 February 1985) is a Fiji international rugby league footballer who last played for the South Sydney Rabbitohs in the  NRL. He previously played for the Catalans Dragons, Canterbury-Bankstown and St George Illawarra.

Background
Millard was born in Kogarah, New South Wales, Australia and is Australian-Fijian descent.

His father Shane Millard is a former reserve-grade coach for the St George Dragons, and his younger brother Ryan Millard plays for the Shellharbour City Dragons in the New South Wales Cup and is also a Fiji international.

Playing career
Millard was a Renown United junior. Millard made his first grade début for the St George Illawarra Dragons in 2006, scoring four tries in the season . He has played centre, wing and fullback in Jersey Flegg and Premier League and has established himself as a centre in first grade. He joined Canterbury-Bankstown in 2007.

Millard played 25 games for 2007 NRL season and scored 13 tries as Canterbury finished sixth on the table.  Millard played in both finals games for the club which both ended in defeat.  In the 2008 NRL season, Millard played 12 games as Canterbury finished last on the table and claimed the wooden spoon.

In 2009, Millard played 11 games for Canterbury-Bankstown as the club finished second on the table and qualified for the finals.  Millard missed out on playing in the club's finals campaign as they reached the preliminary final but were defeated by arch rivals Parramatta at Telstra Stadium.

In 2010, Millard joined the Wakefield Trinity Wildcats team in the  Super League competition on a 2-year contract. He effectively replaced Ryan Atkins who joined the Warrington Wolves.

In June 2012, he signed a new deal with Catalans Dragons, further extending his stay at the club till end of 2014 season.

In Winter 2014, Millard signed for the South Sydney Rabbitohs on a 'Train & Play' basis after completing his contract with the Catalans Dragons.

His younger brother Ryan Millard signed for the Rochdale Hornets after impressing in the 2013 Rugby League World Cup.

International career
Millard was named in the Fiji training squad for the 2008 Rugby League World Cup. He was named in the Fiji squad for the 2008 Rugby League World Cup.

He was named in the Fiji squad for the 2013 Rugby League World Cup. Millard and his brother were selected for the Fiji Bati squad for the 2015 Melanesian Cup test-match. Both played for the Fiji in the first test match against the PNG Kumuls on 2 May 2015 at Cbus Super Stadium, Robina, Gold Coast, Australia.

References

External links
Wakefield Wildcats profile
Bulldogs profile
Korkidas extends stay at Wildcats
Wakefield sign up Bulldog Millard

1985 births
Living people
Australian people of American descent
Australian people of Rotuman descent
Australian people of Fijian descent
Australian expatriate sportspeople in England
Australian rugby league players
Canterbury-Bankstown Bulldogs players
Catalans Dragons players
Exiles rugby league team players
Fiji national rugby league team players
North Sydney Bears NSW Cup players
Rugby league centres
Rugby league players from Sydney
Rugby league wingers
South Sydney Rabbitohs players
St. George Illawarra Dragons players
Wakefield Trinity players